Hyde Park is a neighborhood on the east side of Cincinnati, Ohio. The population was 14,193 at the 2020 census.

It is located on the eastern side of Cincinnati, approximately six miles away from Downtown Cincinnati. Much of the neighborhood is situated between Interstate 71 and the Ohio River. At the center is Hyde Park Square, which is within a 2-block area of Erie Avenue primarily bounded by Edwards Road on the West and Michigan Avenue on the East. The square features a park in the center surrounded by retail shops and restaurants. Its centerpiece is the Kilgour Fountain, which features a  draped female figure with fluted basins. It was donated in 1900 by John and Charles Kilgour.
The Graeter's Ice Cream parlor has been present on Hyde Park Square since 1938.

In 2010, Forbes named Hyde Park one of "America's Best Neighborhoods", citing the education levels of its residents and its high concentration of shops and restaurants.

Demographics

Source - City of Cincinnati Statistical Database

History
Hyde Park initially consisted of a rural area with very few houses as late as 1885, until the Norfolk and Western Railway linked it with Cincinnati in the 1872. Shortly afterwards, population began to increase and in 1892, several prominent Cincinnati real estate businessmen, collectively known as the Mornington syndicate, capitalized on the new transportations to downtown and purchased much of the land to create a community exclusively for Cincinnati's wealthy, selling old parcels to residents who met such criteria. In 1896, the village of Hyde Park was incorporated and was named after the affluent hamlet of Hyde Park in New York.

In November 1903, Hyde Park was annexed by the City of Cincinnati. Almost immediately thereafter, it experienced a real estate boom, bringing hundreds of new residents.

Geography
Hyde Park is located on the eastern side of Cincinnati, approximately six miles away from the Central Business District. Much of the neighborhood is situated between Interstate 71 and the Ohio River. It is bordered by the neighborhoods of East Walnut Hills, Evanston, Mt. Lookout, O'Bryonville, Oakley, and the City of Norwood.

Hyde Park is located on a plateau above the Ohio River Valley and the Miami Valley. Linwood Road, Torrence Parkway and Delta Avenue, all flow towards the Ohio River and follow the major pathways by the major drainage valleys that cut into the plateau.

Climate
As part of Cincinnati, Hyde Park is in the humid continental climate zone (Köppen: Dfa):

Economy

Hyde Park is a largely residential neighborhood, as such, its economy is focused towards small, privately-owned businesses. Hyde Park Square is considered the neighborhood's commercial district and hosts several family-owned shops and boutiques, restaurants, art galleries, banks, and real estate agencies.

Education
The Cincinnati Public Schools district operates public schools, including Withrow High School, Clark Montessori, Kilgour Elementary and The Hyde Park School. Private schools in the neighborhood include the Summit Country Day School, the Springer School and Center, the Cardinal Pacelli School and St. Mary Grade School. 

Hyde Park is also served by a branch of the Public Library of Cincinnati and Hamilton County.

Schools
 Hyde Park School, elementary school
 Kilgour School, elementary school
 Withrow High School, high school 
 Clark Montessori, high school 
 Summit Country Day School, Catholic school 
 Cardinal Pacelli School, Catholic school, part of the National Blue Ribbon School Program. 
 St. Mary Grade School, Catholic school, part of the National Blue Ribbon School Program. 
 Springer School and Center

Neighborhoods bordering Hyde Park 
Columbia-Tusculum
East Walnut Hills
Evanston
Mt. Lookout
Oakley
O'Bryonville

Also bordering Hyde Park is the city of Norwood.

Notable people
Levi Addison Ault, Cincinnati Parks Commissioner
Jim Borgman, Pulitzer Prize winning cartoonist
Dana Fabe, Chief Justice, Alaska Supreme Court
Jim Tarbell, entrepreneur, Former Cincinnati vice-mayor

References

Notes

Further reading
Cincinnati's Hyde Park (OH): A Brief History of a Queen City Gem, published by The History Press (September 24, 2010)

External links
Hyde Park Square website

Neighborhoods in Cincinnati